2002 Egypt Cup Final, was the final match of 2001–02 Egypt Cup, when Zamalek played Baladeyet El-Mahalla at Cairo Stadium in Cairo.

Zamalek won the game 1–0, claiming the cup for the 18th time.

Route to the final

Game description

Match details

References

External links
 http://www.angelfire.com/ak/EgyptianSports/Zamalekcup0102.html

2002
Cup Final
EC 2002
EC 2002